Martin King was a British actor and continuity announcer.

His television credits included Dixon of Dock Green (1961), Crossroads (1964), Detective (1968) and The Troubleshooters (1969). He also appeared in the 1966 Doctor Who serial The Power of the Daleks.

King was associated with the productions of Gerry Anderson, having provided voices for the Supermarionation series Captain Scarlet and the Mysterons (1967–68) and Joe 90 (1968–69). He also had an uncredited role in the film Doppelgänger (1969).

Other film appearances included Poor Cow (1967). King also served as a continuity announcer for both ITV Southern Television and the BBC, introducing episodes of Doctor Who for the latter in the 1970s and 1980s. He also worked in radio, including the BBC World Service.

King died of stomach cancer on 15 April 2019 aged 86. His funeral was held at Corpus Christi Roman Catholic Church, Maiden Lane, also known as the Catholic Actors' Church, on 20 May 2019.

Filmography

References

External links 
 

1933 births
2019 deaths
British male film actors
British male television actors
British male voice actors
Deaths from stomach cancer
Radio and television announcers